Prostanthera rotundifolia, commonly known as round-leaved mintbush or round-leaf mint-bush is a species of flowering plant in the mint family Lamiaceae, and is endemic to south-eastern Australia. It is an erect shrub with aromatic branches covered with short hairs and glands, egg-shaped to more or less round leaves and purple to mauve or pinkish flowers on the ends of branchlets.

Description
The flowers are arranged in leaf axils near the ends of branchlets with bracteoles  but that fall off as the flower develops. Flowering occurs from September to November.

Taxonomy and naming
Prostanthera rotundifolia was first formally described in 1810 by Robert Brown in his treatise Prodromus Florae Novae Hollandiae et Insulae Van Diemen. The specific epithet rotundifolia means "rounded leaves".

Distribution and habitat
Round-leaved mintbush is widespread and locally common in woodland, forest and rainforest margins, often in rocky places in the eastern half of New South Wales and the southern half of Victoria. It also occurs in northern and eastern Tasmania but where it is less common and is listed as "vulnerable" under the Tasmanian Government Threatened Species Protection Act 1995.

Use in horticulture
In cultivation the species and the cultivar ‘Rosea’ have gained the Royal Horticultural Society's Award of Garden Merit.

References

rotundifolia
Flora of New South Wales
Flora of Tasmania
Flora of Victoria (Australia)
Lamiales of Australia
Plants described in 1810
Taxa named by Robert Brown (botanist, born 1773)